The 2023 Tour de France will be the 110th edition of the Tour de France. It will start in Bilbao, Spain on 1 July and end with the final stage at Champs-Élysées, Paris on 23 July.

Teams

22 teams are scheduled to take part in the race. All 18 UCI WorldTeams have been automatically invited. They were joined by 4 UCI ProTeams - the two highest placed UCI ProTeams in 2022 (Lotto–Dstny and Team TotalEnergies), along with Uno-X Pro Cycling Team and Israel–Premier Tech who were selected by Amaury Sport Organisation (ASO), the organisers of the Tour. The teams were announced on 4 January 2023.

UCI WorldTeams

 
 
 
 
 
 
 
 
 
 
 
 
 
 
 
 
 
 

UCI ProTeams

Route and stages 
In January 2022, Amaury Sport Organisation announced that the Basque Country in Spain would host the Grand Départ, with the first stage in Bilbao. In October 2022, the full route was announced by Christian Prudhomme. The Tour will return to the Puy de Dôme for the first time since 1988, and only  of time trials are on the route - the shortest amount since the 2015 edition.

Race overview

Classification leadership

References

External links

 

 
2023 in Spanish sport
2023 in French sport
2023 in road cycling
2023 UCI World Tour
July 2023 sports events in France
2023
Tour de France